"Grenal" is the nickname for matches between two of Brazil's leading football clubs, both located in the city of Porto Alegre, state of Rio Grande do Sul: Gre refers to Grêmio Foot-Ball Porto Alegrense and Nal refers to Sport Club Internacional.

The grenal is one of the fiercest football rivalries in Brazil, South America and the world. It is accompanied by high levels of emotion, competition and occasional violence. The fixture is considered a cultural mark of South Brazil and in particular the Rio Grande do Sul, dividing the state in half, and has been ongoing since 1909. The Grenal is considered the central conflict of the Gauchão (the Rio Grande do Sul state championship), with both teams winning the competition regularly since 1954, and a regular fixture in the Brasileirão (the Brazilian championship).

On December of 2020, FourFourTwo ranked Grenal as the world's 8th biggest derby.

History 
The grenal is one of the fiercest football rivalries in South America. Many well-known players have competed in grenal games, including: Everaldo, Tesourinha, Aírton, Falcão, Éder, Valdomiro, Renato Gaúcho, Taffarel, Dunga, Emerson, Carlos Gamarra, Ronaldinho, Elías Figueroa, D’Alessandro, Marcelo Moreno, Nilmar, Pedro Geromel, Oscar, Walter Kannemann, Alexandre Pato, Alisson Becker, Arthur Melo, Everton Soares, Douglas Costa, Taison, Fábio Bilica and Diego Forlán.

The game has also seen world-famous coaches such as Luiz Felipe Scolari, Abel Braga, Renato Gaúcho, Carlos Alberto Parreira, Telê Santana, Rubens Minelli, Valdir Espinosa, Paulo César Carpegiani and Ênio Andrade manage a game.

First Grenal derby

On June 21, 1909, four representatives of Internacional met with representatives of Grêmio in the Company's headquarters, Leopoldina Portoalegrense, to arrange the first meeting between the two clubs. Internacional, founded two months before, invited Grêmio to be its first opponents. The first match was held on June 27. With a game of Fuss-Ball previously arranged, Grêmio's President, Major Augusto Koch said that his team would face Internacional with the second table (reserve team). The leaders of Internacional demanded that their opponents played with their first team. Grêmio's board agreed. However, as the club's fixture list was full, the game would be held only in the following month.

The first Grenal derby occurred on July 18, 1909, on a Sunday, at the Baixada Stadium in Porto Alegre (which belonged to Grêmio Foot-Ball Porto Alegrense). At 15:10, both teams entered the field of Baixada, preceded by the Presidents and the military band of the Brigade. The Grêmio players wore Sorority shirts divided vertically in half blue and half white, with black shorts. Internacional wore vertically striped shirts in red and white, with white shorts. The audience was estimated to be at 2000.

The referee of the match was Waldemar Bromberg, the assistants were João de Castro e Silva and H. Sommer, and goal judges Theobaldo Foernges Bugs and Theodoro. The goal judges sat on a stool beside the goal areas, indicating whether the ball entered the goal or not, because at the time there were no nets in the goals.

After 10 minutes, Edgar Booth scored the first goal of the game and in the history of the derby. Edgar Booth went on to score four more goals. Four goals were scored by Júlio Grünewald and one by Moreira. The match ended at 10–0 to Grêmio, the biggest win in the history of Grenal.

Grenal of the Century

This match took place at Beira-Rio Stadium on February 12, 1989, being the 297th confrontation between these rival clubs, and it is called "Grenal of the Century" due to its unprecedented importance: it was the second leg of the semi-finals of 1988 Brazilian Championship, soon after the first leg, played at Olímpico Stadium, had ended with no goals.

Both teams came from great campaigns in the league. Internacional had a slight advantage, for if the match ended in a draw, Inter would qualify for the finals and 1989 Copa Libertadores. Teasers and agitation ruled in Porto Alegre.

The attendance was 78,083, in spite of the scorching heat of the summer afternoon: the thermometers marked 40 °C (104 °F).

Grêmio started the match playing better and, at the end of the first half, was winning the match by 1–0 with a goal scored by Marcus Vinicius at 25 minutes. With the red card showed to Inter's right back Casemiro at 38 minutes by referee Arnaldo Cézar Coelho, Grêmio's victory seemed very close.

Inter got better in the second half. At 61 minutes, a free kick favored Inter. Midfielder Edu Lima crossed the ball and Nílson, top scorer of the league, scored to make the match even.

It was Inter who kept pressing, and minutes after, in a counter-attack from the right side, midfielder Maurício passed through two defenders and shot. The ball was going to miss the goal when Nílson appeared behind the back of Grêmio's defense, to score again.

Internacional won the "Grenal of the Century" and qualified to the final match against Esporte Clube Bahia.

Other matches 
On Saturday, February 26, 2022, Grenal 435 was cancelled and postponed for the first time in its history after fans of Internacional attacked Grêmio's bus with an iron bars and rocks, which left athlete Mathías Villasanti with a head trauma and concussion.

State rivalry 

The rivalry of the Grenal reaches beyond football; it is a cultural reference for the Gaúchos. Many residents of Porto Alegre, in the state of Rio Grande do Sul and in much of Santa Catarina and the western region of Paraná, identify strongly with one of the two sides, according to entrenched familial, cultural and social-demographic factors .

Grêmio was founded in 1903 by German immigrants from the Porto Alegre's industrious and commercial upper middle-class, mainly from the northern neighbourhoods from the city, who initially banned poor non-German players. Inter was founded by the children of Italian immigrants, in a meeting at the Second District, a bohemian, commercial and college neighborhood, so mostly of the first Inter players and supporters came from this reality: students from inner Rio Grande do Sul, Italian and azorean immigrants that lived on the place. Inter accepted black players only in the early 1930s. While Grêmio only accepted black players such as Ronaldinho and Everaldo since the 1950s.

Statistics

Titles comparison

 Note (1): Although the Intercontinental Cup and the FIFA Club World Cup are officially different tournaments, in Brazil they are often treated as the same tournament. 

 Note (2): Torneio Heleno Nunes is not considered a title, as the criterion for participation in it was the elimination of clubs in the Brazilian Championship, that is, it "rewarded failure" of participants in another competition.

Records 
The biggest win for Grêmio was 10–0 in 1909 (the very first Grenal) and the biggest win for Inter was 7–0 in 1948.

Highest attendance in Beira-Rio Stadium (Internacional): Internacional 1–1 Grêmio, 85,075, May 30, 1971.

In Olímpico Stadium (Grêmio):  Grêmio 1–1 Internacional, 72,893, November 29, 1981.

References 

Brazilian football derbies
Grêmio Foot-Ball Porto Alegrense
Sport Club Internacional
Nicknamed sporting events